Dai language may refer to:

Tai languages
the Tai languages in general
Dai Zhuang language, Dàizhuàngyǔ, 岱壮语, spoken primarily in Wenshan Prefecture, Yunnan, China
Tai Dam language, Dǎinǎyǔ, 傣哪语; Dǎidānyǔ, 傣担语, spoken by the Tai Dam people in Southeast Asia
Tai Hongjin language, 红金傣语, spoken in Southern China
Tai Lü language, Dǎilèyǔ, 傣仂语, spoken by the Lu people in Southeast Asia
Tai Nüa language, Déhóng Dǎiyǔ, 德宏傣语, spoken by the Dai people, especially in Yunnan province, China
Tai Ya language, Dǎiyǎyǔ, 傣雅语, spoken primarily in southern China and Thailand

Other languages
Dai language (Austronesian), a minor Austronesian language spoken on Dai Island in South Maluku, Indonesia
 Dai language (Chad), an Adamawa language of southern Chad
 Dai language (Solomon Islands), a Malayo-Polynesian group language spoken on northeast Malaita of the Solomon Islands

See also
Dai (disambiguation)